Yingcheng is a town in Jingzhou District, Jingzhou, Hubei province, China. , it administers the following four residential communities and six villages:
Cha'ansi Community
Hetao Community
Juxian Community
Fengming Community
Xinsheng Village
Taihui Village
Jing'an Village
Jingbei Village
Wutai Village
Yingnan Village

References

Township-level divisions of Hubei
Jingzhou